

294001–294100 

|-bgcolor=#f2f2f2
| colspan=4 align=center | 
|}

294101–294200 

|-bgcolor=#f2f2f2
| colspan=4 align=center | 
|}

294201–294300 

|-id=295
| 294295 Brodardmarc || 2007 VU || Brodard Marc (born 1950), a retired teacher and demonstrator at the Observatory Naef, Switzerland || 
|-id=296
| 294296 Efeso ||  || Ephesus (Efeso), a city in the Turkish province of Izmir province, was famed for the nearby Temple of Artemis, one of the seven Wonders of the ancient World. Among many other monumental buildings are the Library of Celsus and a theatre capable of holding 25.000 spectators. Efeso is a UNESCO World Heritage Site. || 
|}

294301–294400 

|-bgcolor=#f2f2f2
| colspan=4 align=center | 
|}

294401–294500 

|-id=402
| 294402 Joeorr ||  || Joseph Newton Orr (1954–2013), a longtime supporter of Lowell Observatory's research and preservation efforts. || 
|}

294501–294600 

|-id=595
| 294595 Shingareva ||  || Kira B. Shingareva (born 1938), a professor at the Moscow State University for Geodesy and Cartography, and the head of the Planetary Cartography Laboratory || 
|-id=600
| 294600 Abedinabedin ||  || Abedin Y. Abedin (born 1982), a friend of Chinese co-discoverer Ye Quan-Zhi || 
|}

294601–294700 

|-id=664
| 294664 Trakai ||  || Trakai is a Lithuanian historic city known for its medieval island castle and lake resort. || 
|}

294701–294800 

|-id=727
| 294727 Dennisritchie ||  || Dennis Ritchie (1941–2011), a computer scientist, creator of the C programming language, and winner of the Turing, Hamming Medal and National Medal of Technology awards. || 
|}

294801–294900 

|-id=814
| 294814 Nataliakidalova ||  || Natalia Kidalova (born 1976) is a school teacher of English and Ukrainian language. She was the winner of the Global Teacher Prize Ukraine 2019, an annual national prize for teachers in Ukraine. || 
|}

294901–295000 

|-bgcolor=#f2f2f2
| colspan=4 align=center | 
|}

References 

294001-295000